Gordon J. Lau (August 22, 1941 – April 20, 1998) was the first Chinese American elected to the San Francisco Board of Supervisors in San Francisco, California. He was elected to the city board of supervisors under Mayor George Moscone in 1977.

Early life
Lau was born in Honolulu, Hawaii and moved with his parents to San Francisco when he was 11 years old. He attended elementary school at St. Mary's, graduated from St. Ignatius High School and went on to attend University of San Francisco, earning bachelor's and law degrees.

Career
Much like his colleague Harvey Milk, who had been an important activist for the LGBT community of San Francisco, Lau was an activist for the city's Asian American community. Lau was initially appointed in 1977 by Moscone to the Board of Supervisors, but won the subsequent election and served until he was defeated in the 1979 election.

Legacy
Gordon J. Lau Elementary School in Chinatown is named in his honor. Before it was renamed to honor Lau, it was originally known as the Oriental Public School until 1924, and Commodore Stockton Elementary School between 1924 and 1998.

References

External links

 
 
 
 
 

1941 births
1998 deaths
People from Honolulu
California politicians of Chinese descent
San Francisco Board of Supervisors members
Activists from the San Francisco Bay Area
20th-century American politicians